Salem is an unincorporated community in Cherokee County, located in the U.S. state of Texas. According to the Handbook of Texas, the community had a population of 20 in 2000. It is located within the Tyler-Jacksonville combined statistical area.

History
The area in what is known as Salem today may have been settled sometime after the American Civil War. A local church acted as the community center. The church, a cemetery, and several scattered houses were located here in the mid-1930s. Most residents left after World War II, but Salem still had a cemetery and a few scattered houses in the 1990s. Joseph T. Cook is buried in the community's cemetery. It had 20 residents in 2000.

Geography

Education
Salem had its own school in 1897 and had 31 students enrolled. It was still operational in the mid-1930s. Today, the community is served by the Rusk Independent School District.

Notes

Unincorporated communities in Cherokee County, Texas
Unincorporated communities in Texas